Patrick or Pat O'Malley may refer to:

Patrick O'Malley (American politician) (born 1950), former Illinois State Senator
Patrick O'Malley (Irish politician) (1943–2021), Irish Progressive Democrats politician 1987–1989
Padraig O'Malley (born 1942), Irish-American academic
Pádraic Ó Máille (1878–1946), Irish politician
Pat O'Malley (actor) (1890–1966), American actor
J. Pat O'Malley (1904–1985), English singer and actor
Seán Patrick O'Malley (born 1944), American cardinal of the Roman Catholic Church

See also 
O'Malley (surname)